Fumarole Butte is a shield volcano in central Juab County, Utah, United States. Built during the Quaternary period, it is composed of basaltic andesite. Under the volcano lies Crater Bench, the result of an eruption of basaltic andesite. To the east of the volcano are a series of hot springs, known as Crater, Baker Hot Springs, or Abraham hot springs.

Background
The lake was created more than 800,000 years ago by extensive precipitation and glacier melting, and has dried up and re-emerged at least 28 times since. The cycles have been matched almost exactly to periods of glaciation by drilling and stratigraphic studies.

Description
Fumarole Butte lies north of the  Sevier Desert. It is located in the scoria-rich valley of a basaltic lava field,  on top of Tertiary-aged structures of rhyolitic lava. Made of red and gray material, its composition ranges from dark basalt to reddish scoria.

Fumarole Butte formed during the Jaramillo normal event, approximately one million years ago. It is a shield volcano with a volcanic neck protruding from the center. On the edges of the volcano, lacustrine deposits can be found where the volcano was once covered by Lake Bonneville.

Crater Bench Formation
Eruptions from Fumarole Butte created the basaltic Crater Bench Formation, which lies beneath the neck. It is around 900,000 years of age, dated to the Pleistocene. The primary component of the lava is aphyric basaltic andesite in which tiny crystalline structures are visible.

References

External links

Shield volcanoes of the United States
Volcanoes of Utah
Landforms of Juab County, Utah
Buttes of Utah